Garissa Airport is an airport in Kenya.

Location
Garissa Airport  is located in the town of Garissa, Garissa County, near the International border with Somalia.

The geographic coordinates of this airport are:0° 28' 7.00"N, 39° 38' 58.00"E (Latitude:-0.468610; Longitude:39.649445).

Airlines and destinations
Garissa Airport is a small civilian airport, serving Garissa and surrounding communities.

See also
 Kenya Airports Authority
 Kenya Civil Aviation Authority
 List of airports in Kenya

References

External links
  Location of Garissa Airport At Google Maps
   Website of Kenya Airports Authority

Airports in Kenya
Garissa
North Eastern Province (Kenya)